Mandell Matheson  was an American journalist and politician who served as a member of the Oklahoma House of Representatives representing the 72nd district between 1972 and 1978. He died December 12, 2011.

Early life and education
Matheson was born on August 13, 1938, in Grady County. He attended school near Tabler, Oklahoma until his family moved to Capitol Hill in Oklahoma City. He started working as a newspaper photographer while attending Capitol Hill High School, where he later graduated.

Career
Matheson worked as a journalist in Oklahoma City, Tulsa, and Indianapolis. He also served in the United States Marine Corps and worked for the Oklahoma Highway Patrol. In 1969 he was the Tulsa Tribune’s capitol bureau.

Political career
Matheson left journalism in 1970 to work for David Hall's gubernatorial campaign.

Oklahoma House of Representatives
Matheson was elected to the Oklahoma House of Representatives in 1972 and would serve until 1978 when he did not seek re-election.

Death
He died in his home in Tulsa, Oklahoma on December 12, 2011.

References

1938 births
2011 deaths
20th-century American politicians
20th-century Members of the Oklahoma House of Representatives
Democratic Party members of the Oklahoma House of Representatives
Writers from Oklahoma